William Dickson defeated John Reah, George W. Campbell, and John Cocke to begin the 7th Congress in place of William C. C. Claiborne.

References 
 

Tennessee 1801 at-large
Tennessee 1801 at-large
1801 at-large
Tennessee at-large
United States House of Representatives at-large
United States House of Representatives 1801 at-large